The Biblioteca Civica Gambalunga is a public library, founded by the mid-18th century, and located on Via Gambalunga # 27, in Rimini, region of Emilia-Romagna, Italy.

History
The Renaissance style palace was built between 1610 and 1614 by the Riminese lawyer, Alessandro Gambalunga. Upon his death in 1619, he bequeathed his book collection and 17th-century palace to the city. Additional donations, and the addition of collections from suppressed religious organizations have increased its holdings. Initially the historical library moved to the ground floor, around the loggias of the inner courtyard. It has now moved to the piano nobile, and sheltered on 17th-century walnut shelves.

The collection holds 226,000 books, including 60,000 rare books (among which are 380 incunabula and nearly 5,000 16th-century editions), 1,350 codices, 6,000 prints, ca. 2,400 periodicals (330 current serials), music scores, cd-roms, audiocassettes, and films. An 11th-century Evangelarium and an early 12th-century codex of Honorius Augustodunensis and a codex by Hugh of Saint Victor are examples of the Beneventan script.

The collection includes the letters to and from Giovanni Bianchi; including correspondence with Voltaire, Spallanzani, Haller, and Monti. The Des Vergers collection records the French project for a Récueil general d’épigraphie latine and other archaeological ventures in the 19th century.

References

Infrastructure completed in 1619
Libraries in Rimini
1619 establishments in Italy
Palaces in Emilia-Romagna
Renaissance architecture in Emilia-Romagna
Libraries established in 1619